Terellia ruficauda  is a species of fly in the family Tephritidae , the gall flies. It is found in the  Palearctic . The larvae feed on Cirsium arvense.
.

Distribution
Central & North Europe, East Russia, Introduced to Canada, United States.

References

Tephritinae
Insects described in 1794
Diptera of Europe